Captina is an unincorporated community in Marshall County, West Virginia, United States. It was also known as Caapteenin, Capteener, Capteening and Woco.

The community most likely takes its name from nearby Captina Creek.

References 

Unincorporated communities in West Virginia
Unincorporated communities in Marshall County, West Virginia